The Boston Ballet is an American professional classical ballet company based in Boston, Massachusetts. It was founded in 1963 by E. Virginia Williams and Sydney Leonard, and was the first professional repertory ballet company in New England. It has been led by Violette Verdy (1980–1984), Bruce Marks (1985–1997), and Anna-Marie Holmes (1997–2000). Mikko Nissinen was appointed artistic director in September 2001.

History

1956-1979 
In 1956, E. Virginia Williams moved the ballet school she founded from a studio in Back Bay to 186 Massachusetts Avenue, across from the Loew's State Theatre in Boston. The school offered classes from children's level all the way to a professional division.

In 1958, out of her Boston School of Ballet (sometimes called The New England School of Ballet), E. Virginia Williams formed a small dance group called The New England Civic Ballet. The group primarily performed at small local festivals and venues around New England.

From 1958-1962, the New England Civic Ballet performed regionally, dancing various pieces such as a three-act Nutcracker, Les Sylphides, and repertory works by E. Virginia Williams, Sydney Leonard, Lev Ianov, and Jean Paige.

In August 1962, the New England Civic Ballet performed as part of the 30th year of the Jacob's Pillow Dance Festival. By this time, the New England Civic Ballet was considered a semi-professional company, and began calling themselves the Boston Ballet.

In December 1963, The Boston Globe reported that a Ford Foundation grant of US$144,000 to the Boston Ballet School had given birth to Boston's first and only professional ballet company. The total Ford Grant was $7,756,000, the largest private subsidy made to a single art form at the time. In part, based on the recommendations of George Balanchine and W. McNeil Lowry, the grant provided for the formation of several professional ballet companies. This included the Boston Ballet, Pennsylvania Ballet, Cincinnati Ballet, and Washington Ballet. Balanchine was a strong supporter of this initiative. He was Boston Ballet's artistic advisor for several years, and gave the new company several of his works.

1979–1989 
In 1979, Boston Ballet opened the Nervi Festival in Italy, and in 1980 was the first American dance company to perform in the People's Republic of China. The Company made its London premiere in 1981, with a full-length production of Swan Lake. In 1983, Boston Ballet presented Don Quixote on Broadway with Rudolf Nureyev as guest artist, after touring the United States, Mexico, France, and Italy. Boston Ballet performed Mark Morris's Mort Subite at the PepsiCo Festival in Purchase, New York in 1986, and performed at the BESSIE Dance and Performance award ceremony at New York City Center in 1987.

1990–1999 
Boston Ballet made its debut at the Kennedy Center in Washington DC, in January 1990. Thay May Natalia Dudinskaya, Konstantin Sergeyev, and assistant artistic director Anna-Marie Holmes staged a new production of Swan Lake with Boston Ballet dancers performing with dancers from the Kirov Ballet and the Bolshoi Ballet.  In 1991, Boston Ballet moved into their current headquarters at 19 Clarendon Street in Boston's South End, after touring throughout Spain in July.

2000–2010 
In 2005, the company added James Kudelka's Cinderella, George Balanchine's Coppélia, Jewels, Midsummer Night's Dream, the American premiere of Jirí Kylián's Black and White, John Cranko's Onegin, The Taming of the Shrew, and Romeo and Juliet to its repertoire. Boston Ballet additionally appointed Jorma Elo as its resident choreographer. Elo created at least six works for the company, including Plan to B, Brake the Eyes, and Le Sacre du Printemps. During the summer of 2007, the company completed a second tour of Spain. Boston Ballet's touring included appearances at the Guggenheim Museum's Works & Process series, the "Fall for Dance" festivals held at New York City Center and Orange County Performing Arts Center, and performances at the Spoleto Festival USA and the Kennedy Center's Ballet Across America series in the spring of 2008. Boston Ballet embarked on its first tour to Seoul, South Korea in the summer of 2008, presenting works by George Balanchine, Twyla Tharp, and Christopher Wheeldon not previously performed there. In the fall of 2009, Boston Ballet's sole performance venue became the Boston Opera House.

Since 2010 
Boston Ballet maintains a repertoire that includes classics such as Marius Petipa's The Sleeping Beauty and August Bournonville's La Sylphide, contemporary versions of classics such as Mikko Nissinen's Swan Lake and John Cranko's Romeo and Juliet, and works by contemporary choreographers including William Forsythe, Jirí Kylián, Mark Morris, David Dawson, Val Caniparoli, Christopher Wheeldon, and Helen Pickett. Over 35 performances employ the entire company and more than 250 Boston Ballet School students who join in the production every year. Boston Ballet's The Nutcracker has been performed annually since 1963.

Boston Ballet II 
Boston Ballet has no official apprentice company. However, they have a secondary company, Boston Ballet II (BBII). For some Boston Ballet II dancers, their work in BBII is their first paid dancer experience. BBII members usually practice with the main company, and perform in some of the main company productions and in some of their own productions.

Boston Ballet School 
The Boston Ballet School (BBS) continues to operate as part of Boston Ballet. The program was officially incorporated as Boston Ballet School in 1979. The studio serves male and female ballet students starting at age 3. The BBS is the largest dance school in North America, providing professional dance education at locations in Boston, Newton, and specialized training at Walnut Hill School For Performing Arts.

Boston Ballet Studios 
Clarendon Street Boston Ballet School Headquarters: The main studio location of the Boston Ballet School. The Clarendon Street Studio also acts as the Headquarters for the school and the greater company, including administrative offices and the marketing team. The Clarendon Street Studio is also home of the Pre-Professional Program.

Newton Boston Ballet School: Originally based in Norwell, Massachusetts, the newer Newton studio opened its doors in August 2017.

Marblehead Boston Ballet School: Located on the second floor of the Lynch Van Otterloo YMCA in Marblehead Massachusetts, the third studio was opened in 2009. It was the smallest of the three studios and closed in 2021.

Specialized Programs 
Pre-Professional Program at Boston Ballet School: The pre-professional program at the Boston Ballet is a stepping stone to the professional company. It is not the same as Boston Ballet II. It is competitive, and accepts about 80 students a year. Students worldwide participate in this program and train directly under the head of the Boston Ballet School and the professional company members. The program is delivered at and in partnership with Walnut Hill School for the Arts for students in grades 9-12. Pre-professional students occasionally perform in Boston Ballet company performances.

Boston Ballet School and Walnut Hill School For Performing Arts: Walnut Hill Academy for the Performing Arts will utilize Boston Ballet School's teachers and students while offering access to Walnut Hill School's academic curriculum, housing, and facilities. The new partnership focused exclusively on Boston Ballet School's pre-professional division, currently made up of 81 students - the school's smallest branch.

Citydance: A community program established in 1991 which introduces third grade students from Boston Public Schools to a free introduction to dance and movement. Citydance faculty travel to Boston Public School classrooms to host an introductory dance workshop. After this introduction, select students are invited to the Clarendon Street Boston Ballet Studios for additional dance and ballet training. Students who choose to continue their training at the Boston Ballet following Citydance receive free tuition for the remainder of their tenure at the Boston Ballet School.

Dancers

Principal Dancers

Soloists

Second soloists

Corps de Ballet (Artists)

BB II

References 

 Boston Phoenix, interview with Mikko Nissinen, August 29, 2011
 NY Times, "Violette Verdy Joining Boston Ballet..." August 21, 1979
 Morris, Marie. (September 12, 2006). Frommer's Boston. Boston: Frommer's; Pap/Map edition.

External links 
 
 
archival footage of Plan to B in 2004 at Jacob's Pillow
Interview with Sydney Leonard, To the Pointe: part 1, part 2

 
Ballet companies in the United States
Ballet schools in the United States
Culture of Boston
Boston Theater District
1963 establishments in Massachusetts
Performing groups established in 1963
Dance in Massachusetts